Wrath of Empire is the second book in the flintlock fantasy trilogy Gods of Blood and Powder written by American author Brian McClellan. It was published by Orbit Books in 2018. The third and last book in the series, titled Blood of Empire, was released on December 3, 2019.

Plot
After the invasion of Fatrasta and the capital city of Landfall, thousands of refugees seek the safety of Lady Flint's soldiers as she prepares for another war to prevent the return of Gods walking the world.

In the capital, Blackhat spy Michel Bravis must infiltrate the invading Dynize to find a person named Mara. Succeeding in this mission could mean winning the war.

Meanwhile, the Mad Lancers led by Mad Ben Styke are building their own army. They are sent on a mission to find and destroy the third Godstone, led by the bloodmage Ka-poel. But what they find may not be what they're looking for.

See also 
 Promise of Blood, the first book in The Powder Mage trilogy
 The Crimson Campaign, the sequel to Promise of Blood
 The Autumn Republic, the sequel to The Crimson Campaign
 Sins of Empire, the first book in the Gods of Blood and Powder trilogy
 Brian McClellan, the author of The Powder Mage trilogy

References

External links 
 Official website of Brian McClellan

2018 fantasy novels
2018 American novels
American fantasy novels
Orbit Books books